The 2016 Asia Cup Final was a day/night Twenty20 cricket match on 6 March 2016 at the Sher-e-Bangla National Cricket Stadium, Mirpur, which was played between Bangladesh and India to determine the winner of the 2016 season of the Asia Cup.

Winning the toss, India elected to field first. Bangladesh set up a  total of 120/5 off 15 overs for their opposition. India chased the total successfully with 13-balls to spare losing 2 wickets in the process.

Hours before the toss, heavy rain lashes Bangladesh capital Dhaka, But the game has been reduced to 15-overs a side, meaning fielding restrictions for five overs. A bowler can bowl a maximum of three overs.

Match Officials and results
 On-field umpires: Ruchira Palliyaguruge, Shozab Raza
 Match referee: Jeff Crowe
  TV Umpire:  Enamul Haque
 Reserve umpire: Anil Chaudhary
 Toss: India elected to field first
 Result: India won by 8 wickets
 League impact:  India won the 2016 Asia Cup

Scorecard

Source : Scorecard on ESPNcricinfo

References

Asia Cup Final
Cricket in Dhaka
Cricket in Sher-e-Bangla National Cricket Stadium